The Legislative Assembly of Espírito Santo is the unicameral legislature of the state of Espírito Santo in Brazil. It has 30 state deputies elected by proportional representation.  It is located in the city of Vitória.

References

External links
Official website

Espírito Santo
Espirito Santo
Espirito Santo